Silcott is an unincorporated community in Asotin County, in the U.S. state of Washington.

History
A post office called Silcott was established in 1883, and remained in operation until 1931. The community was named after John Silcott, an early settler.

References

Unincorporated communities in Asotin County, Washington
Unincorporated communities in Washington (state)